Dvina may refer to:

 Western Dvina, one of the names of Daugava, a river in Russia, Belarus, and Latvia
 Northern Dvina, a river in northern Russia
 R-12 Dvina, a theatre ballistic missile from the Soviet Union
 S-75 Dvina, a surface-to-air guided missile from the Soviet Union

See also
 Dvinia, a therapsid reptile